Nicole Garcia (born 22 April 1946) is a French actress, film director and screenwriter. Her film Charlie Says was entered into the 2006 Cannes Film Festival. Her film Going Away was screened in the Special Presentation section at the 2013 Toronto International Film Festival. She was the President of the Jury for the Caméra d'Or section of the 2014 Cannes Film Festival.

Her eldest son, Frédéric Bélier-Garcia, is a theatre director and writer. From her relationship with Jean Rochefort, she has a second son, the actor Pierre Rochefort.

Filmography

As actress

As filmmaker

References

External links

 

1946 births
Living people
French women film directors
French film actresses
French people of Spanish descent
Pieds-Noirs
People from Oran
French film directors
French-language film directors
Best Supporting Actress César Award winners
French National Academy of Dramatic Arts alumni
French women screenwriters
French screenwriters
French television actresses
20th-century French actresses
21st-century French actresses